The .50-110 WCF  (also known as the .50-100-450 WCF , with different loadings) in modern 1886 Winchesters with modern steel barrels is the most powerful lever-action cartridge, with up to  of energy.

Overview

Introduced in 1899 for the Winchester Model 1886 repeater, the .50-110 WCF  was also available in single-shot weapons such as the Winchester 1885 Hi-Wall. Slight variations in charge weight in the same case led to the mistaken belief these were different rounds, when in fact they were not.

Designed for black powder, the .50-110 was also available in a potent smokeless loading, comparable to British elephant rounds. In power, the standard load was comparable to the contemporary British .500 Black Powder Express. It is sufficient for elk, deer, moose, and bear at medium ranges or in woods, and thin-skinned African game, but not dangerous animals such as elephants. The high-velocity smokeless load was in a class with the .444 Marlin, and its power exceeded the .348 and .358 Winchester.

Winchester continued to offer the cartridge commercially until 1935 and while it is still offered by some suppliers, due to its obsolescence and resultant obscurity, it is significantly more costly than more current cartridges — averaging from US$3 to $4 per round.

Dimensions

See also
 List of cartridges by caliber
 List of rifle cartridges
 13mm caliber
 .50-90 Sharps
 .50-140 Sharps
 .50-70 Government

Notes

Sources
Barnes, Frank C., ed. by John T. Amber. ".50-110 Winchester", in Cartridges of the World, pp. 116 & 124. Northfield, IL: DBI Books, 1972. .
__ and _. ".30-30 Winchester", in Cartridges of the World, p. 34. Northfield, IL: DBI Books, 1972. .
__ and _. ".577 Nitro-Express", in Cartridges of the World, p. 233. Northfield, IL: DBI Books, 1972. .
__ and _. ".500 No. 2 Express (.577/.500)", in Cartridges of the World, p. 230. Northfield, IL: DBI Books, 1972. .
__ and _. ".444 Marlin", in Cartridges of the World, p. 62. Northfield, IL: DBI Books, 1972. .
__ and _. ".348 Winchester", in Cartridges of the World, p. 52. Northfield, IL: DBI Books, 1972. .
__ and _. ".358 Winchester", in Cartridges of the World, p. 54. Northfield, IL: DBI Books, 1972. .

External links

 50-110 Winchester
 50-110 Winchester, or 50-110 WCF 
 50-110 Smokeless Powder Lever Action Rifle
 

Weapons and ammunition introduced in 1899
Pistol and rifle cartridges
Winchester Repeating Arms Company cartridges